{{Infobox book
| name           = kamil al-ziyarat
()
| image          = Kamil_al-Ziyarat.jpg
| caption        = Front cover of  Kamil al-Ziyarat"
| author         = Ibn Qulawayh
| translator     = 
| country        = 
| language       = English
| genre          = 
| published      = Shiabooks.ca Press
| media_type     = Book
| pages          = 
| isbn           = 978-0978147815
}}

Kamil al-Ziyarat (Arabic کامل الزیاره lit. The Complete Pilgrimage Guide'')  is a Hadith collection of 843 traditions, by the famous Twelver Shia Hadith scholar Abul-Gasem Jafar b. Mohammad b. Jafar b. Musab Qulawayh Qumi Bagdadi, commonly known as Ibn Qulawayh.

Author

Abul-Gasem Jafar b. Mohammad b. Jafar b. Musab Qulawayh Qumi Bagdadi, known as Ibn Qulawayh was a dominant Shia traditionist  and jurist. shaykh Al-Kulayni was his teacher and Al-Shaykh Al-Mufid was one of his students. Ibn Qulawayh studied at Qum and Egypt. He authored many books that the most prominent is kamil al-ziyarat.

Authenticity 
Ibn Qulawayh's father had relationship with Sad ibn Abdallah al-Qummi al-Ashari, a great Qummi traditionist. The reference of the narration attributed to al-Kulayni and Ali ibn Babawayh Qummi and al-Numani was Sad ibn Abdallah. 
In kamil al-ziyarat, 61 per cent of traditions had been collected from Qummis like his father in Qum and 13 per cent of them had been narrated from prominent Kufan, Muhammad b. Jafar, al-Bazzaz. This is contingent that in order to collecting traditions Ibn Qulawayh travelled to Baghdad and Egypt. kamil al-ziyarat had been used for developing of some reliable sources like al-Mazar by Al-Shaykh Al-Mufid, Tahdhib al-Ahkam and al-Istibsar by Shaykh Tusi, Bihar al-Anwar, Mustadrak al-Wasa'el and Wasa'el ash-Shi'a.

Context
Kamil al-ziyarat is known as other titles such as al-ziyarat, kamal al-ziyarat but the author had considered kamil al-ziyarat for this book. It contains 843 traditions that set up in 801 chapters.

The shia nature of the kamil al-ziyarat became apparent in some specific chapters of the book. There is 52 traditions at 8-15 chapters associated to Ziyarat of Imam Ali’s grave. Also 69 per cent of tradition are related to visiting of Husayn ibn Ali’s grave.

This book contains following subjects:

The charity of visiting ( Ziyārah ) the Muhammad prophet’s grave
The charity and manner of the visiting of the grave of Ali ibn Abi Talib
 The charity and manner of the visiting of the grave of Hassan ibn Ali
 The charity and manner of the visiting of the grave of Husayn ibn Ali, the charity of Mourning for him
The manner of the visiting of the graves of Musa al-Kadhim and Muhammad al-Jawad
The manner of the visiting of graves of the others The Fourteen Infallibles
The manner of the visiting of graves of the believers
The manner of the visiting of graves of the Imamzadeh (an immediate descendant of a Shia Imam )

Manuscripts
The following version are available:
At the library of Islamic Consultative Assembly, written by Mohammad Shafi Rahmani, in 1083 AH
At the Central Library of Astan Quds Razavi, written by Abu al-Qasim Najafi

See also

List of Shi'a books
The Four Books
Al-Kafi
Man la yahduruhu al-Faqih*

References

Hadith collections
10th-century Arabic books